Jane Welch (born 1964) is a writer of fantasy short stories and novels.

Jane Welch was born in Derbyshire. After school she worked as a bookseller before going for five years to Soldeu, Andorra in the Pyrenees as a ski teacher.

She is married and has two children and lives in Somerset.

Bibliography 

Jane Welch wrote three consecutive Trilogies. The second (The Book of Önd) plays 3 years after the first (Runespell Trilogy) with nearly the same protagonists. The last (The Book of Man) is around 15 years later and is also about the next generation.

Runespell Trilogy
 The Runes of War (1995) 
 The Lost Runes (1996) 
 The Runes of Sorcery (1997)

The Book of Önd
 The Lament of Abalone (1998) 
 The Bard of Castaguard (1999) 
 The Lord of Necrond (2000)

The Book of Man
 Dawn of a Dark Age (2001) 
 The Broken Chalice (2002) 
 The Allegiance of Man (2003)

External links
 
Official Site

1964 births
Living people
British fantasy writers
People from Derbyshire
People from Somerset